The Departmental Council of Var is the deliberative assembly of the French department of Var. The departmental council, currently chaired by Marc Giraud and composed of 46 departmental councillors, sits in Toulon.

History 
The Var departmental council was founded on March 4, 1790, following the creation of the French departments by decree of December 22, 1789 taken by the Constituent Assembly to replace the provinces of France. In 1985, Maurice Arreckx, deputy mayor of Toulon, was elected president of the General Council of Var, thus ending the presidency of the socialist Édouard Soldani (nearly 30 years).

Composition

Vice-Presidents

References 

Var
Var (department)